Institute of Culture was a Soviet institution of vocational education.

Institute of Culture may also refer to:

International institute of culture, Vienna, Austria
Belarusian Institute of Culture
Instytut Kultury (Minsk Metro), Belarus
Minsk Institute of Culture, Belarus
Institute of Culture (Minsk Metro), a Minsk metro station
Bogotan Institute of Culture, Colombia; see Juan B. Gutiérrez
Colombian Institute of Culture, Bogotá
Ramakrishna Mission Institute of Culture, Golpark, Kolkata, India
Sri Aurobindo Institute of Culture, Kolkata, India; see The Future Foundation School, Kolkata
Italian Institute of Culture
Leningrad State Institute of Culture
National Institute of Culture of Panama, see Quantum of Solace
Nicaraguan Institute of Culture, see Government of Nicaragua
National Institute of Culture, Peru
Małopolska Institute of Culture, Poland
Altai State Institute of Culture, see Education in Siberia, Russia
Moscow Institute of Culture, Russia
Kyiv State Institute of Culture, Ukraine
Puerto Rican Institute of Culture, San Juan, Puerto Rico, U.S.
Tashkent State Institute of Culture, Uzbekistan

See also